The Park of Friendship in New Belgrade is one of the largest parks in Belgrade.

Location
The park is located in New Belgrade in the local community Ušće and it extends to a large green area from Hotel Yugoslavia along the Danube and the Sava River to Branko’s Bridge. It is lined with the Mihailo Pupin Boulevard, Ušće and street Nikola Tesla Boulevard. It borders Veliko ratno ostrvo and Malo ratno ostrvo, and the city center of Belgrade through the Danube and the Sava River. Friendship Park covers an area of 14 hectares. It can be reached by local bus by bus lines 15 and 84.

Nature and sports facilities
The park includes a large number of green areas and trees and it leads to the river Sava and river Danube. It is suitable for walking, physical activity or relaxation in nature. The park also has a bike path and a running trail. Although located near the center of Belgrade, peace and quiet prevails in the park. Within the park, there is also Skate Park Ušće.

Construction and history
The idea for the establishment of the Friendship Park of memorial character came from Young Gorani who, in the name of holding the first Conference of NAM in Belgrade in 1961, decided to establish a memorial park as a symbol of the struggle for peace and equality for all peoples in the world. On 29 August 1961, their initiative was supported by the Council for Culture and the Council for Urban Planning of the National Committee of the City of Belgrade. Тito’s planting plane trees on 7 September 1961 was considered the grand opening of the Park. The first preliminary design was done by engineer Vladeta Đorđević, but the final solution regarding the appearance and organization of park space is shown in the project called "Potez," which won first prize at the Yugoslav competition in 1965. The Belgrade City Assembly and the committee on taking care of the construction and development of the park announced an all-Yugoslav competition. The specificity of the subject matter was a challenge to the authors since it treated the field of horticulture, not so frequent competition matter, and the position of the park among the most important government buildings, the Palace of the Federal Executive Council and the former building of the CK CPY (today BC Ušće), Museum of Contemporary Art and Hotel Yugoslavia. Nineteen works took part in the competition, of which three were awarded and eleven were purchased. The first prize was won by the work under the code "Potez" by the architect Milan Pališaški. The second prize was shared by the architects Ranko Radović and Ljiljana Pekić, and the third prize went to the architect Mira Holambek-Bencler from Zagreb. The construction of the park was symbolically marked the establishment of the Non-Aligned Movement, one of the whose founders was Yugoslavia. The work of the architect Pališaški, according to the selection panel, was a strict geometric solution with geometrical divisions and monumental size, ceremonial and representative.

Peace Avenue

The Avenue of Peace with the memorial obelisk "Eternal Flame"  is located in the central part of the park. The park features a flower statue of the sculptor Lidija Mišić. Peace Avenue with 26 plane trees that were planted by statesmen, during a conference of the NAM in Belgrade until 1989, is 180 m long, which also represents the number of countries which had a commitment to peace as their political priority, through the so-called policy of peaceful, active coexistence. All participants of the First Conference planted the same plant – plane tree.
The selection of plane trees is their longevity, which emphasizes the idea of establishing a lasting peace in the world. Next to each planted tree is a tablet with the name of the statesman and the country of origin, year of planting, and the denomination of the tree Platanus acerofilia. Plane tree seedlings are placed at a distance of eight meters so that they could merge at a certain height of their growth and thus form a unique green series which also symbolizes of the connection of all nations through a common idea. From the competition solution to today, only 9.5 hectares of park area have been realized. Although little has been done out of the original idea of the architect Pališaški , specificity in the formation of a modern park is basically considered even today.

Monument “Eternal Flame“

The Eternal Flame memorial is located in the park and is dedicated to the military and civilian victims of the NATO bombing of Yugoslavia. Largely conceived by Mirjana Marković, the leader of the Yugoslav Left and wife of Yugoslav president Slobodan Milošević. It was originally planned to have a height of 78 meters, to symbolize the 78 days of the bombing.

The monument was unveiled on June 12, 2000, to commemorate the first anniversary of the end of the bombing. It was vandalized following the overthrow of Slobodan Milošević and was in a state of ruin for several years.

Famous people in the park
In this park, numerous officials and celebrities planted a tree as a sign of friendship, and among them were the following: Francois Mitterrand, Јоsip Broz Tito, Jawaharlal Nehru, Gamal Abdel Nasser, Queen Elizabeth II, Fidel Castro, Мuammar Gaddafi, Emperor Haile Selassie, Leonid Brezhnev, Mikhail Gorbachev, Richard Nixon, Jimmy Carter, Todor Živkov, Nicolae Ceausescu , Kim Il Sung, Indira Gandhi and others. The last official who planted a tree during the existence of the Socialist Federative Republic of Yugoslavia was the Romanian President Ion Iliesku, who planted the 194th tree in the park in 1991. Even after the breakup of Yugoslavia, the tradition of planting trees in the park was maintained, so the members of the  Rolling Stones planted trees in 2007, before their concert in Belgrade.

Gallery

See also

 Palace of Serbia
 Non-Aligned Movement
 Yugoslavia and the Non-Aligned Movement

References

Parks in Belgrade
New Belgrade